Sa'at Tower also known as Tabriz Municipality Palace (also Romanized as Sā'at Tower) is building in Tabriz which is used as the city hall and main office of the municipal government of Tabriz, East Azarbaijan Province, Iran. Saat tower or Saat in brief, as it briefed by locals in Tabriz, is a building with a hall, a tower with clock, and a small garden in Southwestern side of the building. A circular pool with fountains is located in the middle of the garden.

History
The municipality building was designed by architect Avedis Ohanjanian, and built in 1934 as the Tabriz municipal central office and its city hall. Before World War II it was used by the Azerbaijan Democrat Party as the Government Office, where cabinet meeting used to be held in its main hall. When Iranian troops regained control of Tabriz in 1947, the building was again used as the Tabriz municipal central offices, a function which has continued up to early 2000s when it is used as municipal museum.

Current alterations
During the 1980s, in an attempt for installing an elevator, one of Saat'''s patios was damaged. The dome in top of the tower of Saat was reconstructed on 2008 with a new khaki colored fiber glass instead of the original silver colored dome. Since 2007, part of the building houses the Municipal Museum.

 Architecture 
This building has an area of about 9,600 square meters and 6,500 square meters of infrastructure, which is built on three floors. Tabriz Municipality Palace has a four-page clock tower with a height of 30.5 meters with the rhythmic resonance of its bells, every hour, it brings the passage of time to the ears of the people of Tabriz.The exterior of the building is carved out of stone and the plan of the building is similar to the design of a flying eagle, which corresponds to the example of buildings in Germany before World War II.

Museum of Municipality
In recent years parts of the building is reorganized as municipality museum of Tabriz. The museum includes historical maps of Tabriz, photos of new establishments and major constructions works in Tabriz, and golden key of Tabriz. There are also some of early vehicles, equipment, and machinery used in the city including: first movie projector, first taxi cars, and firefighting tracks. The major hall of the museum includes Tabriz municipality collection of Tabriz rugs.

Ceremonies

Since Saat Tower is located in the center of the city, it has been used for various ceremonies and gatherings in the city. During 1947 it was used as the seat of the Azerbaijan Peoples' Government.

 Iranian new year, at the beginning of every new Iranian Year (20 March), a big Haft-Sin is made behind Saat.
 Earth hour'', since 2014 Tabriz celebrate the earth hour by turning off the lights for Saat Tower.

Etymology
Sa'at means "clock", which refers to the four face clock in top of the tower. Some calls the Saat building, Municipality Palace of Tabriz.

References

External links

Towers in Iran
Museums in Tabriz
Architecture in Iran
Government buildings completed in 1934
Buildings and structures in Tabriz
Government buildings in Iran
Politics of East Azerbaijan Province
1934 establishments in Iran